Chakir Ansari (born June 22, 1991) is a Moroccan freestyle wrestler. He is the first Moroccan freestyle wrestler qualified in Olympic Games. He competed in the men's freestyle 57 kg event at the 2016 Summer Olympics, in which he was eliminated in the round of 32 by Asadulla Lachinau. 
He won the African title in Marrakech 2017. In 2021, he competed at the 2021 African & Oceania Wrestling Olympic Qualification Tournament hoping to qualify for the 2020 Summer Olympics in Tokyo, Japan.

Major results

See also 
 Morocco at the 2016 Summer Olympics
 Wrestling at the 2016 Summer Olympics
 2015 World Wrestling Championships – Men's freestyle 57 kg

References

External links
 
 
 
 

1991 births
Living people
Moroccan male sport wrestlers
Olympic wrestlers of Morocco
Wrestlers at the 2016 Summer Olympics
Competitors at the 2019 African Games
African Games medalists in wrestling
African Games bronze medalists for Morocco
African Wrestling Championships medalists
21st-century Moroccan people
Sportspeople from Clermont-Ferrand